Camp Manitou-Lin is located in Middleville, Michigan, United States, approximately 30 miles south of Grand Rapids. Operated by the YMCA, it was founded in 1913 as a summer camp on the shores of Old Lake Barlow. The camp is at least .

History
From 2011 onwards the camp has run a free program for the children of wounded, disabled or killed military personnel.

References

External links
Camp Manitou-Lin YMCA of Greater Grand Rapids

Manitou-Lin
1913 establishments in Michigan
Manitou-Lin
Manitou-Lin
Buildings and structures in Barry County, Michigan